Eratt House is a historic home located near Bridgeville, Sussex County, Delaware.  It was built about 1750, and is a two-story, three-bay, single-pile brick structure with a gable roof.  The house is in the hall-and-parlor plan.  The house was converted for use as a garage.  It is one of only about a dozen surviving 18th-century brick houses in Sussex County.

It was added to the National Register of Historic Places in 1983.

References

Houses on the National Register of Historic Places in Delaware
Houses completed in 1750
Houses in Sussex County, Delaware
National Register of Historic Places in Sussex County, Delaware